Ralph Erskine (18 March 1685 – 6 November 1752) was a Scottish churchman.

Ralph Erskine was the son of Henry Erskine. He was also the younger brother of another prominent churchman, Ebenezer Erskine.
He was chaplain and tutor to the 'Black' Col. John Erskine from 1705 to 1709. After studying at the University of Edinburgh, Ralph was ordained assistant minister at Dunfermline in 1711. He ratified the protests which his brother laid on the table of the assembly after being rebuked for his synod sermon, but he did not formally withdraw from the establishment till 1737.

He was also present at, though not a member of, the first meeting of the "associate presbytery". When the severance took place over the oath administered to burgesses, he adhered, along with his brother, to the burgher section.

His works consist of sermons, poetical paraphrases and gospel sonnets. The Gospel Sonnets have frequently appeared separately. His Life and Diary, edited by the Rev. D Fraser, was published in 1834.

There is a larger than life size bronze statue of Ralph Erskine on a pedestal, not far from the High Street in the centre of Dunfermline.

He was a Free Gardener being Initiated in the Dunfermline Lodge of Free Gardeners in 1721.

Quotes 
 "Faith, without trouble or fighting, is a suspicious faith; for true faith is a fighting, wrestling faith." – Ralph Erskine, 1733
 "A rigid matter was the law,demanding brick, denying straw,But when with gospel tongue it sings,it bids me fly and gives me wings"      – Ralph Erskine

References

Citations

Sources

External links
 
 

1685 births
1752 deaths
Alumni of the University of Edinburgh
Scottish chaplains
Scottish educators
18th-century Ministers of the Church of Scotland
Scottish diarists
Scottish autobiographers
Free Gardeners
Ministers of Secession Churches in Scotland